Clarence Adrian "Clancy" Holland (born June 21, 1929) is an American politician who served in the Virginia Senate from the 7th district from 1984 to 1996. He spent fifty-three years working as a family physician.

References

External links
 

1929 births
Living people
Democratic Party Virginia state senators
Mayors of Virginia Beach, Virginia
Physicians from Virginia